is a railway station on Kintetsu Railway's Kyoto Line in Kizugawa, Kyoto, Japan.

Lines

Kintetsu Railway
Kyoto Line

Layout
The station has two platforms serving two tracks.

Platforms

History

 1994 - The station opens
 2007 - Starts using PiTaPa

Adjacent stations

References

External links
Official Website

Railway stations in Kyoto Prefecture
Railway stations in Japan opened in 1994